The Texas Junior Brahmas are a Tier III junior ice hockey team based in North Richland Hills, Texas, that plays in the North American 3 Hockey League (NA3HL) South Division. The team plays in the NYTEX Sports Centre and is owned by NYTEX Sports. NYTEX Sports also owns the NYTEX Sports Centre and the North American Hockey League's Lone Star Brahmas, with whom the Jr. Brahmas share the NYTEX Sports Centre.

History
The Jr. Brahmas were founded in 2010 and played in the Western States Hockey League (WSHL) for four seasons.  They advanced to the WSHL Thorne Cup finals after the 2013–14 season.

The Jr. Brahmas then joined the North American 3 Hockey League (NA3HL) prior to the 2014–15 season.  As a member of the NA3HL, they have advanced to the Silver Cup round-robin in the 2015–16 season.

The organization also fields youth hockey teams at the Midget, Bantam, Peewee, and Squirt and other various levels as part of the Texas Brahmas Youth Hockey Association.

Season-by-season records

References

External links
Texas Jr. Brahmas

Ice hockey teams in the Dallas–Fort Worth metroplex
Ice hockey teams in Texas
North Richland Hills, Texas
2010 establishments in Texas
Ice hockey clubs established in 2010